The Quiet Table is the second studio album by the American rock band Three Fish. It was released on June 1, 1999 through Epic Records.

Overview
Three Fish is a musical collaboration between Jeff Ament of Pearl Jam, Robbi Robb of Tribe After Tribe, and Richard Stuverud of the Fastbacks. The album's recording sessions took place from February 1997 to September 1997 at Horseback Court in Blue Mountain, Montana, which is Ament's home studio. The band worked with producer Brett Eliason, who had previously worked with Ament as Pearl Jam's sound engineer. The album was mixed by Eliason. The album's cover art was photographed by Seattle graphic design firm Ames Bros. The album's songs continued the theme of the band's debut album, Three Fish, of combining rock music with mystical-style Eastern music. Stephen Thomas Erlewine of Allmusic said that "while it can seem a little turgid at times, it's an ambitious project that often pays off in intriguing songs and evocative sonic textures." The band toured throughout 1999 in support of The Quiet Table.

Track listing

LP Track listing

Personnel
Three Fish
Jeff Ament – bass guitar, guitar, keyboards, vocals, fretless bass, djembe, 12-string bass guitar
Robbi Robb – acoustic guitar, guitar, percussion, piano, drums, vocals, harmony vocals
Richard Stuverud – guitar, percussion, piano, drums, saxophone, vocals

Additional musicians and production
Pat Aki, John Burton – assistance
Ames Bros – photos and art
Cary Ecklund – keyboards
Brett Eliason – production, mixing
Joe Gastwirt – mastering
Three Fish – production

References

1999 albums
Epic Records albums
Three Fish albums
Albums produced by Jeff Ament